The Kinsale Head gas field is a depleted offshore natural gas field in the Celtic Sea, located  off the southern coast of County Cork, Ireland. Discovered in 1971 near the Old Head of Kinsale, it met Ireland's gas needs until 1996. The gas field is located in a water depth of 100 metres and 1,000 metres below the seabed.

The field extends over Blocks 49/16, 48/20, 48/25, 49/21. The reservoir is a Lower Cretaceous sandstone (Wealden and Greensand) lying at a depth of 2,700 to 3,100 feet. The gas composition was >99% methane with a calorific value of 1.012 Btu/ cubic foot.

During its 42 years in operation, the Kinsale gas field produced an estimated 2 trillion cubic feet (57 billion cubic metres) of natural gas. Operator Kinsale Energy Limited extracted its last commercial quantity of gas on 5 July 2020, after which they ceased production. Decommissioning works began immediately afterwards and, as of 2021, were expected to conclude in 2023. These works included the removal of both platforms, the bulk of which had been removed during 2022.

A floating wind turbine project is proposed for development in the area.

History
Marathon Oil's Irish subsidiary Marathon Petroleum Ireland Ltd., started exploring for oil off the south coast of Ireland and in 1971 instead of finding oil, gas was found off the Old Head of Kinsale by the drill ship Glomar North Sea. The discovery was confirmed as being commercially viable. Bord Gáis Éireann was established in 1975 and confirmed by the Oireachtas in 1976 under The Gas Act (1976) as the supplier and distributor of gas in Ireland.  Gas came on stream in 1978.

The field was developed through two offshore installations.

The process plant comprises a gas/liquid separator, gas is dehydrated in a glycol dehydrator.

Production of gas (in million cubic feet) was:Peak production occurred in 1995.

In 2008, the gas field was proposed as a potential place for the purpose of carbon dioxide capture and storage.

A number of small fields now feed the Kinsale Head platforms including Ballycotton (discovered 1991), Southwest Kinsale (1999) and Seven Heads (2003). Southwest Kinsale was later used for gas storage, primarily for the winter months. These subsea completions are summarized in the following table.

Petronas acquired Marathon's Irish operation in 2009. The nearby discovery at Barryroe is controlled by Providence Resources.

References

Natural gas fields in Ireland